The 1979 NCAA Men's Division II Ice Hockey Tournament involved 4 schools playing in single-elimination play to determine the national champion of men's NCAA Division II college ice hockey.  A total of 4 games were played, hosted by Merrimack College.

The University of Lowell, coached by Bill Riley, won the national title with a 6-4 victory in the final game over Mankato State.

Craig MacTavish, of  the University of Lowell, was named the Most Outstanding Player and was the high scorer of the tournament with six points (4 goals, 2 assists).

Qualifying teams
Due to the lack of conferences and tournaments for western schools the NCAA held a regional tournament to help select teams for the national tournament. The western regional tournament is not considered as part of the NCAA championship but is included here for reference. No automatic bids were offered.

Western Championship Tournament

National Tournament Teams

Bracket

Note: * denotes overtime period(s)

All-Tournament team

G: Brian Doyle (University of Lowell)
D: Mike Weinkauf (Mankato State)
D: Mike O'Connor (University of Lowell)
F: Rob Feenie (Illinois-Chicago)
F: Craig MacTavish (University of Lowell)
F: Tom Jacobs (University of Lowell)

External links

NCAA men's ice hockey championship
 
NCAA Men's Division II Ice Hockey Tournament
NCAA Division II men's ice hockey tournament